Emoia sanfordi, known commonly as  Sanford's emo skink and Sanford's tree skink, is a species of lizard in the family Scincidae. The species is endemic to Vanuatu.

Etymology
The specific name, sanfordi, is in honor of American ornithologist Leonard Cutler Sanford.

Common names
In Vanuatu, E. sanfordi is known as a-kal in the southern Paamese language and ghala [ɣala] in the Raga language.

Habitat

Reproduction
E. sanfordi is oviparous.

References

Further reading
Brown WC (1991). "Lizards of the Genus Emoia (Scincidae) with Observations on Their Evolution and Biogeography". Memoirs of the California Academy of Sciences (15): i-vi, 1-94. (Emoia sanfordi, pp. 61–62, Figure 24).
Schmidt KP, Burt CE (1930). "Herpetological results of the Whitney South Sea Expedition. V. Description of Emoia sanfordi, a new lizard from islands of the Western Pacific (Scincidæ)". American Museum Novitates (436): 1–3. (Emoia sanfordi, new species).

sanfordi
Reptiles of Vanuatu
Reptiles described in 1930
Taxa named by Karl Patterson Schmidt
Taxa named by Charles Earle Burt
Endemic fauna of Vanuatu